Ibtissem Ben Mohamed (born 1 July 1997) is a Tunisian footballer who plays as a defender for AS Banque de l'Habitat and the Tunisia women's national team.

Club career
Ben Mohamed has played for AS Banque de l'Habitat in Tunisia.

International career
Ben Mohamed has capped for Tunisia at senior level, including a 4–0 friendly away win over the United Arab Emirates 6 October 2021.

See also
List of Tunisia women's international footballers

References

External links

1997 births
Living people
Tunisian women's footballers
Women's association football defenders
Tunisia women's international footballers
20th-century Tunisian women
21st-century Tunisian women